On the Rise is the fourth album by the R&B band the S.O.S. Band, released by Tabu Records on July 1, 1983. It was produced by Jimmy Jam and Terry Lewis and Gene Dozier.

History
The album peaked at #7 on the R&B albums chart. It also reached #47 on the Billboard 200. The album yielded two Billboard R&B Top Ten singles, "Just Be Good to Me" and "Tell Me If You Still Care", each peaking at #2 and #5. Both singles also charted on the Billboard Hot 100, reaching #55 and #65. "Just Be Good to Me" also peaked at #3 on the Hot Dance Club Play chart and #13 on the UK Singles Chart. The third single, "For Your Love", also charted on the R&B chart, reaching #34. The album also includes a cover of Johnnie Taylor's 1968 hit song, "Who's Making Love". The album was digitally remastered and reissued on CD with bonus tracks in 2013 by Demon Music Group.

Track listing

Personnel
The S.O.S. Band
Jason Bryant – keyboards, vocals
Mary Davis – lead vocals
Billy Ellis – saxophone
Willie "Sonny" Killebrew – saxophone, flute
Abdul Ra'oof – trumpet, flugelhorn, percussion, lead vocals
John A. Simpson III – bass
Bruno Speight – guitar
Jerome "J.T." Thomas – drums, percussion

Production
Jimmy Jam and Terry Lewis, Gene Dozier, The S.O.S. Band – producers, arrangers
Clarence Avant – executive producer
Tina Stephans – A&R coordinator
Ron Cristopher, Bob Brown, Sabrina Buchanek, Judy Clapp, Taavi Mote – engineers
Steve Hodge – engineer, mixing engineer
Brian Gardner – mastering
Bunnie Jackson Ransom – management 
Ezra Tucker – cover illustration
Ford Smith – back cover photo

Charts

Singles

References

External links
 On the Rise at Discogs

1983 albums
Albums produced by Jimmy Jam and Terry Lewis
Tabu Records albums
The S.O.S. Band albums